The 2012 Milano–Torino was the 93rd edition of the Milano–Torino single-day cycling race. It was held on 26 September 2012, over a distance of 193 km, starting near Milan in Novate Milanese and ending near Turin on the Colle di Superga ("Superga Hill").

Team Saxo Bank–Tinkoff Bank rider Alberto Contador (winner of 2012 Vuelta a España) won the race, having attacked on the final climb to Basilica di Superga, winning a "classic" for the first time in his professional career. Diego Ulissi of Lampre–ISD was second and Astana's Fredrik Kessiakoff completed the podium.

Teams
The start list included 18 teams, with 11 ProTour teams, and more than 150 riders.

Results

References

Milano Torino
2012 in Italian sport
Milano–Torino